Ransol is a village in Andorra, located in the parish of Canillo. The Ransol valley is particularly noted for the diversity of its flora and fauna. In 2006, the village had 188 inhabitants.

References

Populated places in Andorra
Canillo